Tsing Kwai Highway is a section of Route 3 in Hong Kong, previously known as Route 3 - Kwai Chung Section. From its junction with West Kowloon Highway at Mei Foo Roundabout, the expressway runs in the form of a three-kilometre dual-four-lane viaduct atop Kwai Chung Road and Kwai Tai Road, circumscribing the container terminals to reach the Rambler Channel. Then, the highway crosses the channel along a 500-m bridge known as Cheung Tsing Bridge (or Rambler Channel Bridge), and ends at its junction with the Cheung Tsing Tunnel. Tsing Kwai Highway was opened on 19 February 1997.

See also 
 List of streets and roads in Hong Kong

Other highways in Kowloon and New Territories:
 West Kowloon Highway - Route 3
 Tsing Long Highway - Route 3
 Tate's Cairn Highway - Route 2
 Cheung Tsing Highway - Route 3
 Route 2 (Hong Kong)
 Route 3 (Hong Kong)

External links
 Highways in Kowloon
 Route 3 - Kwai Chung and Tsing Yi Sections
 Google Maps of Tsing Kwai Highway

Expressways in Hong Kong
Route 3 (Hong Kong)
Tsing Yi
Kwai Chung
Viaducts in Hong Kong